The Saskatoon Pride Festival, commonly shortened to Saskatoon Pride, is an LGBT pride festival held annually in Saskatoon, Saskatchewan, Canada. Organized by the Saskatoon Diversity Network, a non-profit organization incorporated in 2002, the event takes place in early June each year.

In its current form, Saskatoon Pride was first held in 2001. Community groups in the city had held their own pride-themed events prior to this date, but 2001 marked the first time they were coordinated into a conventional Pride festival with a parade.

The event kicks off with a raising of the rainbow flag at Saskatoon City Hall on the Monday of Pride Week, and concludes with a parade and community fair on the Saturday.

References

External links
 

Pride parades in Canada
Festivals in Saskatoon
LGBT in Saskatchewan
2001 establishments in Saskatchewan
Festivals established in 2001